Ajda is an Arabic and Turkish surname and given name, and a Slovene word for buckwheat, infrequently also used as a female given name. It may refer to:

 Ajda Novak (born 1993), Slovenian slalom canoeist
 Ajda Pekkan (born 1946), also known as Süperstar, Turkish pop singer and actress
 Masruq ibn al-Ajda' (died 682), tabi'i, jurist and muĥaddith

See also

References 

Arabic-language surnames
Arabic feminine given names
Turkish feminine given names
Slovene feminine given names